Robert Roy Cunningham (December 6, 1876 - October 11, 1958) served in the California State Senate for the 27th district from 1937 to 1953 and during the Spanish–American War he served in the United States Army.

References

External links
Join California Robert Roy Cunningham

American military personnel of the Spanish–American War
Democratic Party California state senators
1876 births
1958 deaths
20th-century American politicians
People from Sherman, Texas